The Liguilla de Ascenso a Segunda División, was a championship of yesteryear that existed in Perú where the champion was promoted to play in the Segunda División the following year (except in its last edition that was promoted to the Primera División).

It began to be played in 1954 with the champions of the Ligas Provinciales de Lima y Callao. In the following years, the champion of the Liga de los Balnearios del Sur, the Liga Distrital de San Isidro and, in its latest editions, other districts of Lima joined.

It was played until 1973 and after the inclusion of the teams from the province of Lima in the Copa Perú it was replaced by Liga Provincial de Lima (Interligas de Lima).

Champions

References

External links

3
Peru
Defunct sports competitions in Peru